The 1992 World Karate Championships are the 11th edition of the World Karate Championships, and were held in Granada, Spain from November 19 to November 22, 1992.

Medalists

Men

Women

Medal table

 Athletes from Yugoslavia competed as Independent Participants and under Olympic flag.

References

 Results
 Results

External links
 Karateka magazine report
 World Karate Federation

World Championships
World Karate Championships
1992
International karate competitions hosted by Spain
Karate competitions in Spain
Sport in Granada